Piletosoma argoponalis is a moth in the family Crambidae. It is found in Panama.

The wingspan is about 27 mm. The forewings are brown-black with a bronzy reflection.

References

Moths described in 1914
Pyraustinae